Dan Philibert (born 6 August 1970 in Paris) is a retired French hurdler.

His personal best time was 13.26 seconds, achieved at the 1997 World Championships in Athens.

Achievements

References

1970 births
Living people
French male hurdlers
Athletes (track and field) at the 1992 Summer Olympics
Olympic athletes of France
Athletes from Paris
Mediterranean Games gold medalists for France
Mediterranean Games medalists in athletics
Athletes (track and field) at the 1991 Mediterranean Games
Athletes (track and field) at the 1993 Mediterranean Games